Gene Simmons (born Chaim Witz;  ; born August 25, 1949) is an Israeli-American musician. Also known by his stage persona the Demon, he is the bassist and co-lead singer of Kiss, the hard rock band he co-founded with Paul Stanley, Ace Frehley and Peter Criss in the early 1970s. Simmons was inducted into the Rock and Roll Hall of Fame in 2014 as a member of Kiss.

Early life
Simmons was born as Chaim Witz on August 25, 1949, at Rambam Hospital in Haifa, Israel, to Jewish immigrants from Hungary. His mother, Florence Klein (1925–2018) (née Flóra Kovács), was born in Jánd and survived internment in Nazi concentration camps. She and her brother, Larry Klein, were the only members of the family to survive the Holocaust. Simmons' father, Ferenc "Feri" Yehiel Witz (1925–2002), was a carpenter. Simmons spent his early childhood in Tirat Carmel and was raised in a practicing Jewish household. He has said that his family was "dirt poor", scraping by on rationed bread and milk. At the age of seven, he began to pick wild fruit and sell it on roadsides together with a friend.

Aged eight, he immigrated to the United States with his mother and settled in New York City. His father remained in Israel, where he has another son and three daughters. In the United States, Simmons changed his name to Gene Klein, adopting his mother's maiden name. When he was nine, he briefly attended a Jewish religious school, Yeshiva Torah Vodaas, before transferring to a public school. He later attended Richmond College and Sullivan County Community College, both in New York, and chose a stage name in tribute to the rockabilly singer Jumpin' Gene Simmons. He practiced playing his guitar for hours on end. Before his musical career began, Klein worked a variety of jobs in the city. A proficient typist, he served as an assistant to an editor of Vogue, and spent several months as a sixth grade instructor on the Upper West Side.

The Beatles had a significant influence on Simmons. "There is no way I'd be doing what I do now if it wasn't for the Beatles. I was watching The Ed Sullivan Show and I saw them. Those skinny little boys, kind of androgynous, with long hair like girls. It blew me away that these four boys [from] the middle of nowhere could make that music."

Career

Kiss

Simmons became involved with his first band, Lynx, then renamed the Missing Links, when he was a teenager. Eventually, he disbanded the band to form the Long Island Sounds, the name being a pun on Long Island Sound. While he played in these bands, he worked at odd jobs on the side to make more money, including trading used comic books. Simmons attended Sullivan County Community College in Loch Sheldrake, New York. He joined a new band, Bullfrog Bheer, and the band recorded a demo, "Leeta"; this was later included on the Kiss box set.

Simmons formed the rock band Wicked Lester in the early 1970s with Stanley Eisen (now known as Paul Stanley) and recorded one album, which was never released. Dissatisfied with Wicked Lester's sound and look, Simmons and Stanley attempted to fire their band members; they were met with resistance, and they quit Wicked Lester, walking away from their record deal with Epic Records. They decided to form the "ultimate rock band", and started looking for a drummer. Simmons and Stanley found an ad placed by George Peter John Criscuola (known as Peter Criss) who was playing clubs in Brooklyn at the time; they joined and started out as a trio.

During this time, Criss and Simmons also appeared on an unreleased album by Captain Sanity together with members from Criss' previous band Chelsea. Paul Frehley (better known as Ace Frehley) responded to an ad they put in The Village Voice for a lead guitar player, and soon joined them. Kiss released their self-titled debut album in February 1974. Stanley took on the role of lead performer on stage, while Simmons became the driving force behind what became an extensive Kiss merchandising franchise. The eye section of his "Demon" makeup with Kiss came from the wing design of comic book character Black Bolt.

In 1983, when Kiss's fame was waning, the members took off their trademark make-up and enjoyed a resurgence in popularity that continued into the 1990s. At this time, Peter Criss, the original drummer, was voted out of the band, and a replacement was sought to fill his vacancy. The new drummer was Paul Charles Caravello, who went by the stage name of Eric Carr, and played for Kiss from 1980 until his death in 1991. The band hosted its own fan conventions in 1995, and fan feedback about the original Kiss members reunion influenced the highly successful 1996–1997 Alive Worldwide reunion tour. In 1998, the band released Psycho Circus. Since then, the original line-up has once again dissolved, with Tommy Thayer replacing Ace Frehley on lead guitar and Eric Singer (who performed with Kiss from 1991 through 1996) replacing Peter Criss on drums.

Other projects
In 1989, Simmons managed the recording side of Liza Minnelli's entry into mainstream pop.

On August 15, 2013, Simmons, Paul Stanley and manager Doc McGhee became a part of the ownership group that created the LA Kiss Arena Football League team, which played their home games at the Honda Center in Anaheim, California. The team has since folded.

He has his own magazine, Gene Simmons Tongue Magazine, his own label, Simmons Records, and animated series, My Dad the Rock Star. Simmons Records has released albums by such bands as Kobra and the Lotus, Silent Rage, Gypsy Rose and House of Lords as well as Gene's own solo releases.

Film and television
Simmons has been involved with such television projects as:
My Dad the Rock Star, a cartoon by the Canadian animation company Nelvana, about the mild mannered son of a Gene Simmons-like rock star
Mr. Romance, a show created and hosted by Simmons on the Oxygen cable television channel
Rock School, a UK reality show in which Simmons tries to make a rock band out of a group of students of Christ's Hospital School in the first season, and in the second, a group of kids from a comprehensive school in Lowestoft
Gene Simmons Family Jewels, a reality show documenting the personal lives of Simmons, his wife, his son and daughter

In 1985, Simmons appeared on the TV series Miami Vice in an episode titled "The Prodigal Son". The episode served as the season premiere of the show's second season. Simmons appeared as a psychic working at the Mystic Journey Bookstore in Venice, California on the American hidden camera prank TV series I Get That a Lot. He also guest-starred as himself in the 2014 CSI: Crime Scene Investigation episode Long Road Home.

Simmons performed in the 1984 Michael Crichton thriller Runaway starring Tom Selleck, Cynthia Rhodes and Kirstie Alley as well as the 1987 Gary Sherman action film Wanted: Dead or Alive starring Rutger Hauer.

In March 2015, Simmons founded the film production company Erebus Pictures and announced as the first project  the Horror-thriller film Armed Response.

In 2022, Simmons became a judge of the talent competition show Yoshiki Superstar Project X, airing on Hulu Japan and produced by Japanese musician and composer Yoshiki.

Playing style
Simmons plays bass, and lead vocals are split between Simmons and rhythm guitarist Paul Stanley in most Kiss songs. Some notable songs featuring Simmons singing lead include "God of Thunder", "Rock and Roll All Nite", "Deuce", "A World Without Heroes", "I Love It Loud", "Calling Dr. Love", "Unholy", "You Wanted the Best" (first lead vocals), and "Christine Sixteen", among others. Simmons possesses a baritone voice.

Stage makeup and persona
In addition to playing bass, Simmons is known for his long tongue, which he frequently sticks out while performing, and on stage is known for his demonic figure by spitting fire and vomiting stage blood. Some publications reported that his tongue measured up to 7 inches long and he had it insured for $1 million, although Simmons himself has neither confirmed nor denied this.

Personal life

Simmons is a science fiction and comic book fan and published several science-fiction fanzines, among them Id, Cosmos (which eventually merged with Stilletto to become Cosmos-Stilletto and then Faun), Tinderbox, Sci-Fi Showcase, Mantis and Adventure. He also contributed to other fanzines, among them BeABohema and Sirruish. By 1977, however, he would write in a letter of comment to Janus, "I haven't been active [in fandom] for about five years".

Simmons lives in Los Angeles with his wife Shannon Lee Tweed, a Canadian actress and former Playboy Playmate. Although they began dating in 1983, they did not marry until 28 years later. Simmons often joked that he and Tweed were "happily unmarried" for over 20 years. He also often paraphrased Groucho Marx, saying "Marriage is an institution, and I don't want to live in an institution". Simmons and Tweed wed on October 1, 2011, at the Beverly Hills Hotel. They have two children: Nick (born January 22, 1989) and Sophie (born July 7, 1992). He formerly had live-in relationships with Cher and Diana Ross, revealing that he fell in love with Ross while dating Cher. Simmons can speak Hungarian, German, English, Hebrew, and some Japanese. Simmons does not drink alcohol or use drugs.

Simmons has boasted many times about having bedded thousands of women. In 2010, he claimed the tally stood at 5,000 and that he has a Polaroid picture of each liaison, including the hotel key where it took place. Simmons has always been open about his disdain for drug and alcohol use, and has proudly claimed many times over "I've never been high or drunk in my life".

Homecoming visit to Israel
In March 2011, Simmons visited his birth country, Israel. He described the trip as a "life changing experience". He talked about how he still feels that he is an Israeli: "I'm Israeli. I'm a stranger in America. I'm an outsider". While there, Simmons met his half-brother Kobi, and triplet half-sisters Drora, Sharon and Ogenia. Simmons announced he has plans to take Kiss to Israel. He has said that he is an ardent supporter of Israel. At a press conference in Israel, he spoke in both Hebrew and English.

Political views
Simmons was a supporter of the foreign policy of the George W. Bush administration. He supported the 2003 invasion of Iraq, writing on his website: "I'm ashamed to be surrounded by people calling themselves liberal who are, in my opinion, spitting on the graves of brave American soldiers who gave their life to fight a war that wasn't theirs... in a country they've never been to... simply to liberate the people therein". In a follow-up, Simmons explained his position and wrote about his love and support for the United States: "I wasn't born here. But I have a love for this country and its people that knows no bounds. I will forever be grateful to America for going into World War II, when it had nothing to gain, in a country that was far away... and rescued my mother from the Nazi German concentration camps. She is alive and I am alive because of America. And, if you have a problem with America, you have a problem with me".

During the 2006 Lebanon War between Israel and Hezbollah in Lebanon, Simmons sent a televised message of support (in both English and Hebrew) to an Israeli soldier seriously wounded in fighting in Lebanon, calling him his "hero".

In 2010, Simmons said he regretted voting for Barack Obama and criticized the 2009 health care reforms. Following Obama's 2011 speech on the Middle East in which the President called on Israel and the Palestinians to negotiate a settlement "based on the 1967 lines with mutually agreed swaps", Simmons told CNBC that Obama was gravely misguided. "If you have never been to the moon, you can't issue policy about the moon. For the president to be sitting in Washington D.C. and saying, 'Go back to your '67 borders in Israel' – how about you live there and try to defend an indefensible border – nine miles (14 km) wide?" Simmons also accused the United Nations of being "the most pathetic body on the face of the earth".

During his visit to Israel in 2011, he stated that the artists refusing to perform in Israel for political reasons are "stupid".

In an April 2012 interview, Simmons endorsed Republican Mitt Romney for President: "America should be in business and it should be run by a businessman."

On November 6, 2015, he attended a Friends of the Israel Defense Forces gala in Beverly Hills, which raised more than $31 million.

In an August, 2021 interview, Simmons said regarding the honesty of the Donald Trump administration, "[W]e all lie to some extent, but what happened the last four years was beyond anything I ever thought imaginable from people who had lots of power — not just him, but the administration, everybody.

On November 10, 2021, he stated that people who refused to get the COVID-19 vaccine are  "an enemy" and called them "evil".

Philanthropy
Simmons is a known advocate for ChildFund International's work. He traveled to Zambia during his Gene Simmons Family Jewels show to visit several of his sponsored children, of whom he has more than 140. Simmons said that the trip "[was] a stark reminder that life doesn't treat everyone the same".

Simmons's family received the MEND Humanitarian Award for their philanthropic efforts and support for Mending Kids International at the organization's annual gala on November 9, 2013. The award was presented by Mel Gibson. In his acceptance speech, Simmons spoke of his own difficult childhood in Israel in a bullet-riddled house. He recalled his mother's excitement when they received a CARE box one day.

Simmons helped found "The Children Matter", which is a collaborative initiative with the charity MATTER that fights to get kids around the world access to health care.

He is an advocate for public safety during the coronavirus pandemic, encouraging people to wear face masks and following social distance protocols.

Controversial public statements and image

NPR interview

During an interview on the National Public Radio program Fresh Air on February 2, 2002, Simmons told Terry Gross: "If you want to welcome me with open arms, I'm afraid you're also going to have to welcome me with open legs", paraphrasing a lyric from the Who's 1981 song "You Better You Bet". Gross replied: "That's a really obnoxious thing to say". At the time, Simmons refused to grant permission to NPR to make the interview available online. However, it appears in print in Gross' book All I Did Was Ask and unauthorized transcripts are available. NPR re-broadcast part of the interview in August 2007. In a 2014 interview with The Huffington Post, Simmons noted he was upset over what he perceived as Gross's "holier-than-thou" attitude, which included mislabeling his band Kiss as "the Kiss".

Comments on Islam
In 2004, during an interview in Melbourne, Australia, while talking about Islamic extremists, Simmons described Islam as a "vile culture", saying that Muslim women had to walk behind their husbands and were not allowed to be educated or to own houses. He said: "They want to come and live right where you live and they think that you're evil." Australia's Muslim of the Year Susan Carland argued that Simmons's stereotyping of Muslims was inaccurate. Simmons later clarified his comments on his website, saying he had been talking specifically about Muslim extremists.

Defamation lawsuit by former girlfriend
In 2005, Simmons was sued by a former girlfriend, Georgeann Walsh Ward, who said she had been "defamed" in the VH1 documentary When Kiss Ruled the World and portrayed as an "unchaste woman". A settlement was reached in June 2006.

Views on musical piracy
In 2007, Simmons openly spoke out against music piracy, and called for file-sharers to be sued. A year later, he threatened further lawsuits, and to withhold new recordings, if file-sharing continued. In 2010, Anonymous staged a DDoS on his website, prompting Simmons to hit back with provocative comments once he was back online, at which point Anonymous staged a second DDoS, taking Simmons's site down again.

In September 2014, Simmons said "The death of rock was not a natural death. Rock did not die of old age. It was murdered." Simmons blames file sharing and that no one values music "enough to pay you for it" for the decline of the rock music scene.

Comments on suicide and depression
In August 2014, Simmons made comments in an interview with Songfacts.com that encouraged those with depression to kill themselves.I never understand, because I always call them on their bluff. I’m the guy who says ‘Jump!’ when there’s a guy on top of a building who says, “That’s it, I can’t take it anymore, I’m going to jump.” Are you kidding? Why are you announcing it? Shut the fuck up, have some dignity and jump! You’ve got the crowd.The comments drew criticism from Nikki Sixx of Mötley Crüe who had suffered from depression in the past. Following his comments, both Triple M and Winnipeg radio station Power 97 stated that they were pulling all Kiss songs from their lineup in protest. Simmons later clarified his comments and apologized for the incident.

Fox & Friends incident
On November 16, 2017, Simmons made an appearance on Fox & Friends to promote a new book, but shortly afterward, he burst into a staff meeting uninvited, unbuttoning his shirt and telling jokes. The next day, on November 17, Fox News announced that Simmons was banned for life from their program, as well as from entering any of the company's properties. Simmons later issued a statement saying that he has "a tremendous amount of respect" for the company's workers and apologized for "unintentionally offending" any staff members during his visit.

Sexual harassment allegations

In 2018, Simmons settled a sexual assault lawsuit with an unnamed radio personality, who accused him of touching her inappropriately. The woman claimed that Simmons touched her and “turned standard interview questions into sexual innuendos.” Despite the settlement, Simmons denied the allegations.

In 2019, Ace Frehley stated that Simmons had attempted to grope his wife, calling Simmons an "asshole and a sex addict".

Awards and recognition
On January 28, 2011, Simmons was in Dallas, Texas to host the Aces & Angels Salute to the Troops charity event. Simmons was presented the key to the city, and a street (Gene Simmons Boulevard) was named for him. Simmons and Tweed also visited the U.S. Army base at Fort Hood to support the troops as a part of the Aces & Angels event.

On June 15 of the same year, he was given the key to the city in Winnipeg, Manitoba. In 2012, Simmons was awarded the Golden God award by the Revolver magazine.

In 2013, the Smithsonian National Museum of American History accepted an autographed Gene Simmons Axe bass into their collection from John Upshaw Downs, Jr. The Smithsonian wrote, in part: "The bass will now be cared for in our permanent collections... We are happy to include the Axe bass as it relates to the impact Mr. Simmons and his band Kiss have had on American culture, especially in the creation of a unique and iconic brand that has been embraced by fans worldwide ... The story of Mr. Simmons' American experience deserves to be preserved. An immigrant and son of a holocaust survivor, he used creative vision and entrepreneurial acumen to make a significant impact for our nation's popular culture, becoming an iconic figure in American music and entertainment."

Simmons is an honorary board member of Little Kids Rock, a national nonprofit that works to restore and revitalize music education in disadvantaged U.S. public schools. A&E's Gene Simmons Family Jewels visited a Little Kids Rock classroom and featured the segment on the show. He also decorated a guitar for auction with his son Nick.

On December 15, 2014, Simmons was awarded the Golden Medal by the Reial Cercle Artístic de Barcelona (Royal Artistic Circle of Barcelona).

Filmography

Film

Television appearances

Music video appearances
In 1994, Simmons appears as auditioning for the band with actor Al Lewis & comedian Gilbert Gottfried in a music video for "I'll Talk My Way Out Of It" by Howard Stern comedian Stuttering John.
In 2007, he appeared alongside other celebrities, as well as regular people, in the music video for "Rockstar" by Nickelback.

Video game appearances
Gene Simmons is a playable character in Tony Hawk's Underground, unlocked when completing the story mode on Normal difficulty, and also appears with his Kiss bandmates in the Hotter Than Hell level to play one of three songs upon collecting the four K-I-S-S letters.

Gene Simmons's Kiss character, the Demon, is a playable character in Kiss: Psycho Circus: The Nightmare Child. Simmons also has a large role in the 2010 music video game Guitar Hero: Warriors of Rock. In addition to narrating the main storyline, voicing the character Demigod of Rock in cutscenes, and doing advertising for the game, the Kiss song "Love Gun" is playable.

A Dark-Normal Type Pokémon introduced in Pokémon Sword and Shield known as Obstagoon the Blocking Pokémon resembles Gene Simmons's KISS character: The Demon.

Discography

Studio albums
Gene Simmons (1978)
Asshole (2004)

Box sets
 Vault (2017)

DVDs
 Speaking in Tongues (2004)

Guest appearances
 Wendy O. Williams – WOW (1984) Producer, played all the bass on the album (credited as "Reginald Van Helsing"), co-wrote five songs "I Love Sex (And Rock and Roll)", "It's My Life", "Thief in the Night", "Legends Never Die" and "Ain't None of Your Business".
 Bruce Kulick – BK3 (2010) Lead vocals on "Ain't Gonna Die"
 Engelbert Humperdinck – Engelbert Calling (2014) co-vocals on "Spinning Wheel"
 Lita Ford – Time Capsule (2016) played bass on several songs, co-writing and backing vocals on "Rotten to the Core"

Publishing career
In 2002, Simmons launched Gene Simmons' Tongue, a men's lifestyle magazine. The magazine lasted five issues before being discontinued.

Other ventures
In 1976–77, Simmons signed a management and production contract with the band Van Halen. He produced a Van Halen demo tape and attempted to find a record deal for the band with a variety of major record labels. When no deal materialised, he released them from their contract.

From 2006 to 2008, Simmons served in a marketing and publicity role with the Indy Racing League.

In 2012, Simmons headlined the Rock N Roll All Stars tour which performed in stadiums across South America. The project also featured several other Rock N Roll Hall of Famers including Def Leppard's Joe Elliot, Guns N' Roses' Duff McKagan & Matt Sorum and Deep Purple's Glenn Hughes as well as Billy Idol's Steve Stevens, Collective Soul's Ed Rolland, Sebastian Bach, Alice in Chain's Mike Inez and the Cult's Billy Duffy. On March 1, 2012, the line up and the tour was revealed at a news conference hosted by Promoter Gabe Reed at the Roxy theater in Hollywood, CA. Simmons was in attendance and the entire news conference and subsequent tour was featured on Simmons Family Jewels' series finale episodes.

In 2012, Simmons partnered with Paul Stanley and three other investors to form the restaurant franchise Rock & Brews.

In 2017, Simmons launched "The Vault" which is a compilation of all of his major works selling for $2,000.

In 2018, Simmons was named "Chief Evangelist Officer" of the Canadian cannabis company Invictus MD Strategies. Simmons also holds a large investment stake in the company.

Published works
 Me, Inc.: Build an Army of One, Unleash Your Inner Rock God, Win in Life and Business, Gene Simmons
 Kiss and Make-Up, Gene Simmons
 Sex Money Kiss, Gene Simmons
 Kiss: The Early Years, Gene Simmons and Paul Stanley
 Kiss: Behind the Mask, David Leaf and Ken Sharp
 Ladies of the Night: A Historical and Personal Perspective on the Oldest Profession in the World, Gene Simmons
27: The Legend & Mythology of the 27 Club

References

External links

1949 births
Living people
20th-century American guitarists
20th-century American male actors
20th-century American male singers
20th-century American singers
21st-century American male actors
21st-century American male singers
21st-century American singers
American bloggers
American film producers
American hard rock musicians
American heavy metal bass guitarists
American heavy metal singers
American investors
American magazine publishers (people)
American male bass guitarists
American male bloggers
American male film actors
American male guitarists
American male singer-songwriters
American male television actors
American male video game actors
American male voice actors
American people of Hungarian-Jewish descent
American philanthropists
American rock bass guitarists
American rock guitarists
American rock singers
American rock songwriters
American Zionists
Businesspeople from New York City
Businesspeople in the cannabis industry
Critics of the United Nations
Guitarists from New York City
Israeli emigrants to the United States
Israeli Jews
Israeli people of Hungarian-Jewish descent
Jewish American male actors
Jewish American musicians
Jewish heavy metal musicians
Jewish rock musicians
Jewish singers
Kiss (band) members
Male actors from New York City
Male bass guitarists
Musicians with fictional stage personas
Participants in American reality television series
People from Haifa
People from Staten Island
People from Tirat Carmel
People with acquired American citizenship
Record producers from New York (state)
Singers from New York City
Singer-songwriters from New York (state)
Television producers from New York City
The Apprentice (franchise) contestants